The men's 800 metres was a track and field athletics event held as part of the Athletics at the 1904 Summer Olympics programme. It was the third time the event was held. 13 runners from 3 nations participated. The competition was held on September 1, 1904. The event was won by Jim Lightbody of the United States, the nation's first title in the 800 metres. The United States, with 10 of the 13 runners, swept the medals—the first sweep of the 800 metres podium.

Background

This was the third appearance of the event, which is one of 12 athletics events to have been held at every Summer Olympics. None of the runners from 1900 returned. There was no clear favorite, "but Jim Lightbody . . . was not one of the prominent names mentioned." Johannes Runge of Germany had run the 800 metres handicap event earlier in the day due to confusion over English instructions. 

Canada appeared in the event for the first time. The United States and Germany each made their second appearance, matching France, Great Britain, and Hungary for the most among all nations.

Competition format

In contrast to the previous editions in 1896 and 1900, the 1904 version of the 800 metres consisted of a single round rather than heats and a final.

The track was a cinder track 1/3 mile in length with one long straightaway.

Records

These were the standing world and Olympic records (in minutes) prior to the 1904 Summer Olympics.

(*) This track was 500 metres in circumference.

Jim Lightbody set a new Olympic record with 1:56.0.

Schedule

Results

Cohn led early, with Breitkreutz and Runge behind him. Lightbody started slowest. About halfway, Runge took the lead and Lightbody began to push forward. Breitkreutz took the lead over Runge (who had also run the 800 metres handicap event earlier in the day due to confusion), with Underwood second, before the final straight. Lightbody finished his last-to-first push, winning by 2 yards over Valentine, who also made a late push.

Sources

 

Athletics at the 1904 Summer Olympics
800 metres at the Olympics